Janes Aviation is a British cargo airline based at London Southend Airport.

Janes Aviation Limited holds a United Kingdom Civil Aviation Authority Type A Operating Licence, it is permitted to carry passengers, cargo and mail on aircraft with 20 or more seats.

History

Janes Aviation (1987-1992)
On 1 December 1987 Andy Janes and his wife Hilary formed Janes Aviation as a cargo airline at Southend Airport. The airline operated Douglas DC-3, Dart Herald aircraft. In 1992 the company was renamed Emerald Airways with new partners and an involvement with EuroManx it started low-cost passenger services. In October 2002, Emerald bought Exeter based Streamline Aviation.

In June 2005, EuroManx successfully bought the passenger service of Emerald Airways, which was operating low cost services from Liverpool John Lennon Airport to the Isle of Man, using BAe ATPs.
The airline AOC licence was suspended in May 2006 and the company went into liquidation.

Janes Aviation (2006-2010)
Andy Janes now without any connection to the failed Emerald Airways re-formed his original company Janes Aviation Limited in October 2006.

On 28 April 2008 the airline was granted a Type A Operating Licence from the United Kingdom Civil Aviation Authority. The airline also hold an Air Operators Certificate No. 2318 to operate the Hawker Siddeley 748.

Fleet 
The Janes Aviation fleet at May 2008 was:

See also
 List of defunct airlines of the United Kingdom

References

External links 

Airlines established in 2006
Cargo airlines
Companies based in Essex
Southend-on-Sea (town)
Rochford District
Defunct airlines of the United Kingdom